Cold climate may refer to:

 Polar climate
 Ice cap climate
 Tundra climate
 Alpine climate
 Subarctic climate
 Continental climate